Megumi Horikawa (born Tsugane) (born 18 October 1995) is a Japanese judoka.

She is the gold medallist of the 2012 Judo Grand Slam Tokyo in the -63 kg category.

She won the gold medal in her event at the 2022 Judo Grand Slam Tel Aviv held in Tel Aviv, Israel.

References

External links
 
 

1995 births
Living people
Japanese female judoka